Christian Authier, born 1969 in Toulouse, is a French writer and journalist. He has a master's degree in history from the University of Toulouse II and a degree from the Institut d'études politiques de Toulouse. His second novel, Les Liens défaits from 2006, received the Roger Nimier Prize. He received the 2014 Prix Renaudot de l'essai for De chez nous. He has written several non-fiction books about cinema, including two devoted to Clint Eastwood. He has also worked for Le Figaro littéraire.

Bibliography
Novels
 Enterrement de vie de garçon, Éditions Stock, 2004
 Les Liens défaits, Éditions Stock, 2006
 Une si douce fureur, Éditions Stock, 2006
 Une Belle époque, Éditions Stock, 2008
 Une certaine fatigue, Éditions Stock, 2012
 Soldat d'Allah, Éditions Grasset and Fasquelle, 2014
Non-fiction
 Patrick Besson, Le Rocher, 1998
 Foot Business, Éditions Hachette, 2001
 Les Bouffons du foot, Le Rocher, 2002
 Clint Eastwood, Fitway Publishing Éditions, 2005
 Lady B, Éditions Le Castor Astral, 2007
 Remix # 4, Éditions Hachette Littératures, 2008
 Deuxièmes séances, Éditions Stock, 2009
 De chez nous, Éditions Stock, 2014

References 

20th-century French novelists
20th-century French male writers
21st-century French novelists
French non-fiction writers
Roger Nimier Prize winners
1969 births
Living people
Writers from Toulouse
French male novelists
21st-century French male writers
French male non-fiction writers
Prix Renaudot de l'essai winners
Le Figaro people